Kim Eun-hye (born 8 May 1987) is a South Korean sports shooter. She competed in the women's 10 metre air rifle event at the 2016 Summer Olympics.

References

External links
 

1987 births
Living people
South Korean female sport shooters
Olympic shooters of South Korea
Shooters at the 2016 Summer Olympics
Place of birth missing (living people)